Roy Watling , PhD., DSc, FRSE, F.I.Biol., C.Biol., FLS (born 1938) is a Scottish mycologist who has made significant contributions to the study of fungi both in the identification of new species and correct taxonomic placement, as well as in fungal ecology.

Biography
Dr. Watling served as the Head of Mycology and Plant Pathology,  as Acting Regius Keeper of the Royal Botanic Garden Edinburgh and as a visiting professor at Ramkhamhaeng University in Bangkok, Thailand.  He was awarded a Patrick Neill Medal and an Outstanding Contribution to Nature Award from the Royal Society for the Protection of Birds.  He is a member of the German, American, and Dutch Mycological Societies and of the North American Mycological Association.  Since his retirement, he has been active in leading fungal forays and education events for youth in and around Edinburgh. He was president of the Botanical Society of Scotland from 1984 to 1986. In 1997, Watling received the honour of Member of the Most Excellent Order of the British Empire (MBE) for services to science. In 1998, the Royal Society of Edinburgh awarded him the Neill Medal, a triennial distinction recognising outstanding work by a Scottish naturalist.

While much of his work has been in identifying and expanding knowledge of fungi in the tropics, Watling has also done extensive research in much of the UK and North America.  He is listed as an author of over 500 fungal taxa in the nomenclatural database MycoBank. An example of Watling's work in Scotland can be seen in a 1983 study detailing the fungal populations of the Hebrides; this study highlights how little is known of fungi in some isolated locations in the United Kingdom. Working along with R. W. G. Dennis, Watling published several papers adding to the 1,787 species of fungi located on the Island of Mull in the Inner Hebrides. The unique geographic composition of these islands, as well as limited human influence makes the Hebrides an interesting location for fungal diversity. His work in the Shetland Islands, Hebrides, and northern Scotland provides insight into distribution patterns of Russula, Laccaria, Inocybe, Cortinarius, Amanita nivalis, Omphalina alpina and Omphalina hudsoniana (as well as other taxa) in relation to climatic and geographical variance. This information was further updated with a publication in 1994 with his publication of the Fungus Flora of Shetland, and in 1999 publication of The Fungus Flora of Orkney.  Further research into the alpine arctic relationship with fungi can be seen in his study of seven taxa of coprophilous fungi in the Falkland Islands.

Watling has written books which range from high degrees of specificity on topics like Boletus diversity, to entry-level mycology books. He was one of the editors of the first compendium of Basidiomycota of the British isles. His work has also had wider global impacts outside of the fungi kingdom.  His work focusing on chloromethane production provides evidence of the role of white-rot fungi in the tropical rain forest methane cycle.  This is especially critical with wider impacts of global warming and de-forestation impacts of the tropics. This research was further developed by a study published in 2005 that found that fungi are one of the largest sources of atmospheric chloromethane production.  This information also suggests the greater impact that white-rot wood decay fungi have in development of a microbial soil sink for chloromethane.

Watling has also worked on developmental studies of fungal fruit bodies. His work has contributed to polymorphism studies with Psilocybe merdaria, and with dimorphism in Entoloma abortivum. Watling was also the first to correctly identify and describe a parasitic relationship between Entoloma and Armillaria in their carpophoroid form.  While debate is still on the parasitic relationship of whom parasitises whom, Watling's discovery has shed light on a new relationship of fungi on an important edible mushroom. Watling has studied the genus Armillaria.  A compendium was published in 1982, as well as studies of Armillaria in Australia and the United States.

Royal Botanical Gardens Edinburgh

While working as head of mycology at the RBGE he staged fungal forays at Dawyck Botanic Garden.  At the RBGE, he established further knowledge of ectomycorrhizal (ECM) relations to specific trees and their distributions across the UK. He helped to contribute Scottish material to a diverse range of fungal collections in the RBGE herbarium.

One of his publications focused on the Sitka Spruce, an introduced forestry tree species in Scotland, as well as macrofungi in the oak woods, birch woods, and willows of the UK. This information along with his paper published in 1981 of macromycetes and development in higher plant communities, illustrates the unique important role ECM fungi have in the UK.

His work has also extended to studying ECM fungi in Kashmir  and the Guinea-Congo. While Watling is semi-retired, he is still called upon regularly for mushroom identification and leads many educational forays. He helped to identify a new species in Thailand that was recently named in honour of the Thai Queen Sirikit in 2014. Fungus species named after Watling include Amanita watlingii, Conocybe watlingii, and Ramaria watlingii.

He helped to celebrate the work of Beatrix Potter as a mycologist and scientific artist.

References

1938 births
Living people
Scottish mycologists
Fellows of the Royal Society of Edinburgh
Members of the Order of the British Empire